A Woman's Decision (also known as The Quarterly Balance) is a 1975 Polish drama film written and directed by Krzysztof Zanussi. It was entered into the 25th Berlin International Film Festival, where it won the OCIC Award.

Cast
 Maja Komorowska as Marta
 Piotr Fronczewski as Jan
 Marek Piwowski as Jacek
 Zofia Mrozowska as Jan's Mother
 Halina Mikolajska as Roza
 Mariusz Dmochowski as Director
 Barbara Wrzesinska as Ewa
 Chip Taylor as James
 Eugenia Herman as Zofia
 Elzbieta Karkoszka as Maria
 Celina Mencner as Halina
 Krzysztof Machowski as Rower
 Malgorzata Pritulak as Anna
 Danuta Rinn as Marta's Colleague
 Kazimiera Utrata as Marta's Colleague
 Stefan Szmidt as Rescuer
 Dariusz Adamczuk	
 Marian Friedmann	
 Józef Fryzlewicz as Assistant Manager
 Antonina Girycz as Marta's Colleague
 Zbigniew Jankowski
 Krystyna Kolodziejczyk as Secretary
 Marcin Mroszczak
 Leszek Mystkowski
 Irena Oberska
 Joanna Poraska
  William Powers as Jacek's Colleague
 Alina Rostkowska
 Jan Sieradzinski
 Tadeusz Somogi as Manager
 Andrzej Szenajch as Jacek's Colleague
 Józef Wieczorek

Critical reception
Roger Ebert gave the film four out of four stars, and wrote "Here's a film that has so much to say about one particular woman, and says it so eloquently, that nobody since Bergman has seen a woman character more clearly. The film is "A Woman's Decision," by Krzysztof Zanussi, who was already Poland's best director and now graduates to grandmaster class."

References

External links
 
 

1975 films
1975 drama films
1970s Polish-language films
Films directed by Krzysztof Zanussi
Films scored by Wojciech Kilar
Polish drama films